Douwe Egberts is a Dutch brand of coffee which is majority-owned by JDE Peet's. It was founded in Joure, Netherlands, by Egbert Douwes in 1753 as De Witte Os ("The White Ox"), a general grocery shop. The company later started dealing specifically in coffee, tea, and tobacco. By 1925, it had changed its name to Douwe Egberts (as in Douwe, the son of Egbert) and introduced its logo, a red seal with a "D.E." initialism.

Its former tobacco brand White Ox was named for the original De Witte Os grocery store in Joure; Douwe Egberts sold White Ox to Imperial Tobacco in 1998.

In May 2017, Douwe Egberts launched aluminium coffee capsules across supermarkets.

At the end of 2019, the company merged with Peet's Coffee and the two continue under the new name JDE Peet's. At the end of May 2020, this company was listed on the Euronext Amsterdam. JDE Peet's has an annual turnover of approximately €7 billion.

Origin and tradition

Douwe Egberts' origins are in Joure, West Frisia where Egbert Douwes established a grocery shop called "De Witte Os" ("The White Ox") in 1752. The company transferred to his eldest son Douwe Egberts in 1780, from whom it adopted its current name.

Court case against the Province of Groningen 
The Dutch Province of Groningen was sued in 2007 by Douwe Egberts for explicitly requiring its coffee machine suppliers to meet the EKO organic standard and the fairtrade criteria set by Stichting Max Havelaar, most notably the payment of a minimum price for its coffee and a development premium to producer cooperatives. Douwe Egberts sold a number of coffee brands under self-developed ethical criteria and argued that the requirements were discriminatory. After several months of discussions and legal challenges, the province of Groningen prevailed in a well-publicised judgment in favor of the Province. Coen de Ruiter, director of Stichting Max Havelaar, called the victory a landmark event: "it provides governmental institutions the freedom in their purchasing policy to require suppliers to provide coffee that bears the fair trade criteria, so that a substantial and meaningful contribution is made in the fight against poverty through the daily cup of coffee".

References

External links
 
 

JDE Peet's
Coffee brands
Food and drink companies established in 1753
Drink companies of the Netherlands
Dutch brands
Tea brands
Buildings and structures in Utrecht (city)
Coffee in Europe
Agriculture companies of the Netherlands